Jon Torger Hougen (23 October 1936 in Sheboygan – 28 January 2019 in Taipei) was an American spectroscopist.

Education and career 
Hougen finished his undergraduate degree at the University of Wisconsin in 1956. He obtained his Master's and doctoral degrees at Harvard University. He worked at Harvard University under the research direction of William Moffitt and William Klemperer. He started his career in 1960 as a Postdoctorate Fellow at the National Research Council of Canada in the Molecular Spectroscopy group of Gerhard Herzberg. He joined the staff at NRC in 1962 and supervised Postdoctorate 
Fellows J.K.G.Watson and Philip Bunker. In 1967 he joined the National Bureau of Standards (now the National Institute of Standards and Technology). He started there as a member of D.R. Lide's Microwave and Infrared Group. Later, he was the chief of the Molecular Spectroscopy Section. In 1984, he was named a senior research fellow. For a year, he served as acting chief of the Molecular Physics Division. After retiring in 2001, he continued his research as a NIST scientist emeritus.

Research 
His research focused on quantum mechanical and group theoretical calculations of quantities related to molecular spectroscopy.

Three of his most-cited publications are:

 This paper develops a Hamiltonian that has come to be called the Hougen-Bunker-Johns (HBJ) Hamiltonian.

Hobbies 
He spoke several languages: French, French-Canadian, German, Czech, Japanese, and Mandarin in addition to English.

Awards 
Hougen received the following awards:

 Coblentz Award in 1968
 NBS Silver Medal in 1974
 Fellow of American Physical Society in 1979
 NBS Gold Medal in 1980
 Ellis R. Lippincott Award in 1984
 Earle K. Plyler Prize for Molecular Spectroscopy in 1984
 Marcus Marci Award from the Czech Spectroscopy Society in 1990

The Journal of Molecular Spectroscopy dedicated two special issues to him in honor of his 68th and 80th birthday. Two awards have been created in his memory: Jon Hougen travel award for the 26th Colloquium on High-Resolution Molecular Spectroscopy and the Jon Hougen Memorial Award that will be awarded annually at the International Symposium on Molecular Spectroscopy starting in 2020.

References 

American chemists
1936 births
2019 deaths
People from Sheboygan, Wisconsin
University of Wisconsin–Madison alumni
Harvard University alumni